Hagood is an unincorporated community in the High Hills of Santee area in western Sumter County, South Carolina, United States. It lies west of South Carolina Highway 261, north of Stateburg and is the location of Magnolia Hall, which is listed on the National Register of Historic Places. Its mail now comes from Rembert zip code 29128. The community was originally called Sander's Station by the South Carolina Railway, apparently for Dr. Swepson Saunders, the owner of Magnolia Hall plantation, on which it was located, but was renamed Hagood for Johnson Hagood, brigadier general in the Confederate States Army and later governor of South Carolina.

References

External links 
 South Carolina Department of Archives and History file on Magnolia Hall
 Names in Sumter District
 Map of Sumter County
 Another map of Sumter County
 Topo Map of Hagood

Unincorporated communities in South Carolina
Unincorporated communities in Sumter County, South Carolina
High Hills of Santee